The 1st IIFA Utsavam ceremony honouring the winners and nominees of the best of South Indian cinema in 2015 was an event held on 24 and 25 January 2016 at the Gachibowli Athletic Stadium, Hyderabad. Marking the inaugural event of the IIFA Utsavam, it recognised the best work from the four industries during the period from late 2014 to late 2015 and awarded prizes to performers and technicians from the Tamil, Telugu, Malayalam and Kannada languages.

Awards and Nominees

Main awards

Kannada cinema

Malayalam cinema

Tamil cinema

Telugu cinema

Other awards
 Special Award: K. Balachander
 Best Cinematographer (Malayalam): Amal Neerad (Iyobinte Pusthakam)
 Best Production Designer (Tamil): Sabu Cyril (Baahubali: The Beginning)
 Best Background Music: B. Ajaneesh Loknath (Rangitaranga)
 Best Sound Mixing: Murali Rayasam (Rangitaranga)

References

Specific

2016 Indian film awards
International Indian Film Academy Awards
IIFA awards